Greece and Ellinikí Radiofonía Tileórasi (ERT) chose to host a National Selection with the winner being chosen an "expert" jury. Christos Callow & Wave were chosen with "Horis skopo" and placed 19th at Eurovision.

Before Eurovision

National final 
The final took place on 23 March 1990 at the ERT TV Studios in Athens and was hosted by Olina Xenopoulou. The songs were presented as video clips and the winning song was chosen by a panel of "experts".

At Eurovision
"Horis skopo" was performed second on the night (following Spain's Azúcar Moreno with "Bandido" and preceding Belgium's Philippe Lafontaine with "Macédomienne"). At the close of voting, it had received 11 points, placing 19th in a field of 22.

It was succeeded as the Greek representative at the 1991 Contest by Sophia Vossou with "I Anixi".

Voting

References 

1990
Countries in the Eurovision Song Contest 1990
Eurovision